Jimmy Rogers (June 3, 1924December 19, 1997) was an American Chicago blues singer, guitarist and harmonica player, best known for his work as a member of Muddy Waters's band in the early 1950s. He also had a solo career and recorded several popular blues songs, including "That's All Right" (now a blues standard), "Chicago Bound", "Walking by Myself" (his sole R&B chart appearance), and "Rock This House". He withdrew from the music industry at the end of the 1950s, but returned to recording and touring in the 1970s.

Career
Rogers was born Jay or James Arthur Lane in Ruleville, Mississippi, on June 3, 1924. He was raised in Atlanta and Memphis. He adopted his stepfather's surname. He learned to play the harmonica with his childhood friend Snooky Pryor, and as a teenager he took up the guitar. He played professionally in East St. Louis, Illinois, with Robert Lockwood, Jr., among others. Rogers moved to Chicago in the mid-1940s. By 1946, he had recorded as a harmonica player and singer for the Harlem record label, run by J. Mayo Williams. Rogers's name did not appear on the record, which was mislabeled as the work of Memphis Slim and His Houserockers.

In 1947, Rogers, Muddy Waters and Little Walter began playing together, forming Waters's first band in Chicago (sometimes referred to as the Headcutters or the Headhunters, because of their practice of stealing jobs from other local bands). The band members recorded and released music credited to each of them as solo artists. The band defined the sound of the nascent Chicago blues style (more specifically, South Side Chicago blues). Rogers recorded several sides of his own with small labels in Chicago, but none were released at the time. He began to achieve success as a solo artist in 1950, with the song "That's All Right", released by Chess Records, but he stayed in Waters's band until 1954. In the mid-1950s he had several successful records released by Chess, most of them featuring either Little Walter or Big Walter Horton on harmonica, notably "Walking by Myself". In the late 1950s, as interest in the blues waned, he gradually withdrew from the music industry.

In the early 1960s, Rogers briefly worked as a member of Howling Wolf's band, before quitting the music business altogether for almost a decade. He worked as a taxicab driver and owned a clothing store, which burned down in the 1968 Chicago riots following the assassination of Martin Luther King Jr.  Rogers gradually began performing in public again, and in 1971, when fashions made him somewhat popular in Europe, he began occasionally touring and recording, including a 1977 session with Waters which resulted in the album I'm Ready. By 1982, Rogers was again a full-time solo artist. He continued touring and recording albums until his death.

In 1995, Rogers was inducted into the Blues Hall of Fame. His song, "That's All Right", was inducted by the organization in 2016 as a "Classic of Blues Recording", which identified it as a blues standard.

Rogers died of colon cancer in Chicago in 1997. He was survived by his son, Jimmy D. Lane, a guitarist, record producer and recording engineer for Blue Heaven Studios and APO Records.

Partial discography
Singles
"That's All Right" backed with "Ludella" (1950, Chess)
"Goin' Away Baby" / "Today, Today, Blues" (1950, Chess)
"The World's in a Tangle" / "She Loves Another Man" (1951, Chess)
"Out on the Road" / "The Last Time" (1952, Chess)
"Chicago Bound" / "Sloppy Drunk" (1954, Chess)
"Walking by Myself" / "If It Ain't Me (Who You Thinking Of)" (1956, Chess)
"Rock This House" / "My Last Meal" (1959, Chess)

Albums
Chicago Bound (1970, Chess), compilation of 1950s Chess recordings
 Sloppy Drunk (1973, Black & Blue), studio album recorded in 1973
 Gold Tailed Bird (1971, Shelter)
Jimmy Rogers (1984, Chess Masters series), double LP compilation with more 1950s recordings
That's All Right (1989, Charly), compilation of Chess recordings
 Ludella (1990, Antone's), studio and live recordings  1990
 Jimmy Rogers with Ronnie Earl and the Broadcasters (1993, CrossCut), live recording from 1991
 Feelin' Good (1994, Blind Pig), with Rod Piazza
 Blue Bird (1994, Analogue Productions), studio recording from 1993
 The Complete Chess Recordings (1997, Chess/MCA), double CD
 Blues Blues Blues (1999, Atlantic), as the "Jimmy Rogers All-Stars", with Mick Jagger, Keith Richards, Eric Clapton, Taj Mahal, Lowell Fulson, Jimmy Page, Robert Plant, Jeff Healey and others

References

Sources

1924 births
1997 deaths
People from Ruleville, Mississippi
Musicians from Atlanta
Musicians from Memphis, Tennessee
American blues guitarists
American male guitarists
American blues harmonica players
American blues singers
Blues musicians from Mississippi
Chess Records artists
Deaths from cancer in Illinois
Deaths from colorectal cancer
20th-century American singers
20th-century American guitarists
Guitarists from Georgia (U.S. state)
Guitarists from Mississippi
Guitarists from Tennessee
20th-century American male musicians
Black & Blue Records artists